Dermomurex infrons is a species of sea snail, a marine gastropod mollusk in the family Muricidae, the murex snails or rock snails.

Description
The length of the shell varies between 19 mm and 47 mm.

Distribution
This marine species occurs off Japan, Taiwan, the Philippines, Indonesia and New Caledonia.

References

 Petit R.E. (2009) George Brettingham Sowerby, I, II & III: their conchological publications and molluscan taxa. Zootaxa 2189: 1–218. 
 Merle D., Garrigues B. & Pointier J.-P. (2011) Fossil and Recent Muricidae of the world. Part Muricinae. Hackenheim: Conchbooks. 648 pp. page(s): 220

Gastropods described in 1974
Dermomurex